Sympistis astrigata is a species of moth in the family Noctuidae (the owlet moths). It was first described by William Barnes and James Halliday McDunnough in 1912 and it is found in North America.

The MONA or Hodges number for Sympistis astrigata is 10134.

References

Further reading

 
 
 

astrigata
Articles created by Qbugbot
Moths described in 1912